Meadvilla is a historic house in Natchez, Mississippi, USA. It has been listed on the National Register of Historic Places since November 17, 1982.

References

Houses on the National Register of Historic Places in Mississippi
Federal architecture in Mississippi
Greek Revival houses in Mississippi
Houses in Adams County, Mississippi